Nalinthip Sakulongumpai (born 12 August 1990 in Bangkok, Thailand), also known as Bua Nalinthip is a Thai actress and model. She debuted in 2006. She is known for playing Kiew in Thai TV Channel 3's Tra Barb See Chompoo (2018) and Praomook in Praomook (2021).

Early life and education
Nalinthip was born on 12 August 1990 in Bangkok, Thailand. During her secondary education, she attended Sribunyanon School in Nonthaburi, Thailand.She received a Bachelor's Degree in Communication Arts from Suan Sunandha Rajabhat University in Bangkok, Thailand.

Career 
Nalinthip entered the Thai entertainment industry when she competed in the Miss Teen Thailand beauty pageant in 2006. Her participation in the contest opened doors for her to pursue acting as a career. She has also appeared on several other shows.

In 2014, Nalinthip made her acting debut by playing the lead role Jumjim in the drama Ruk Nee Jhe Jud Hai. Then she played supporting roles in several drama.

In 2018, she played the lead roles of twin sister Sina and Siriya in the drama Khun Mae Suam Roy. She gained popularity for her portrayal of gentle Sina and rebellious Siriya. The same year, Nalinthip played the lead role of Kangsadan/Kiew and appeared in the drama Tra Barb See Chompoo, alongside Nawasch Phupantachsee. The series was a success both domestically and internationally. Nalinthip gained widespread recognition and popularity for her portrayal of Kiew.

In 2021, She starred in the drama Praomook, playing the titular character Praomook. She played the role of Praomook or Mook opposite actor Nawasch Phupantachsee, who played the role of Chalunthorn, creating a very peculiar story in which it starts with a love-hate relationship. But eventually they will begin to fall in love with each other and will face many obstacles on their way.

Nalinthip also has a YouTube show on the Hubsub channel entitled Buasri is happy.

Filmography

Television dramas

Television series

Music video appearance
 2023 Chan Man Pen Khon Baeb Nee (ฉันมันเป็นคนแบบนี้) Ost.Manee Phayabat -  (Boom) (The One Enterprise/YouTube:one31) with Thitipoom Techaapaikhun

MC
 Online 
 20 : On Air YouTube:

References

External links

1990 births 
Living people 
People from Bangkok 
Actresses from Bangkok 
Thai television actresses
21st-century Thai actresses
Thai female models
Thai television personalities
Thai YouTubers